Azhar bin Matussin is a Malaysian politician who has served as Member of the Sabah State Legislative Assembly (MLA) for Darau since September 2020. He served as the State Assistant Minister of Trade and Industry of Sabah in the Heritage Party (WARISAN) state administration under former Chief Minister Shafie Apdal and former Minister Wilfred Madius Tangau from May 2018 to the collapse of the WARISAN state administration in September 2020 and MLA for Karambunai from May 2018 to September 2020. He is a member of WARISAN.

Election results

References

Members of the Sabah State Legislative Assembly
Sabah Heritage Party politicians
Living people
Year of birth missing (living people)